Ganbare Goemon: Seikūshi Dynamites Arawaru!! is a Goemon game released for the Game Boy Color on December 21, 2000.

Plot 
It's another peaceful day in Edo, when out of nowhere a spaceship resembling the head of a cat appears high in the sky. Inside, a weird-dressed, muscle-bound character known as Spaceman Dynamite starts planning something mischievous that will surely bring trouble to the good people below, and in consequence to Goemon and his friends.

Gameplay 
The game alternates between stages featuring either Goemon or Ebisumaru. Each character takes a different route towards the bad guy and as a result the stages scroll differently for each character. The player can collect upgraded items and weapons but there's no character upgrading besides that. The game also features mid-level bonus rounds featuring the rest of Goemon's buddies in several arcade mini-games as traditional for the series.

References

2000 video games
Game Boy Color games
Game Boy Color-only games
Ganbare Goemon games
Japan-exclusive video games
Video games developed in Japan

Cooperative video games